Bożena Ksiąźek (born January 6, 1963 in Węgorzewo) is a Polish sprint canoer who competed in the late 1980s. At the 1988 Summer Olympics in Seoul, she finished eighth in the K-4 500 m event and ninth in the K-2 500 m event.

References
 Sports-reference.com profile

1963 births
Living people
People from Węgorzewo
Canoeists at the 1988 Summer Olympics
Olympic canoeists of Poland
Polish female canoeists
Sportspeople from Warmian-Masurian Voivodeship